The Stair Society is a learned society devoted to the study of Scots law. It was instituted in 1934 "to encourage the study and to advance the knowledge of the history of Scots Law," and is named for James Dalrymple, 1st Viscount of Stair, the seventeenth century Lord President of the Court of Session considered the most important of Scots Law's Institutional Writers. It is comparable to the Selden Society, an organisation devoted to the study of English legal history.

Society
The Society has around four hundred and fifty members from Scotland and around the world. The Society holds an annual general meeting in November, which includes a guest lecture. Recent distinguished figures to have addressed the Society included Alan Watson, Rogers Professor at the University of Georgia School of Law, and John H. Langbein, Sterling Professor of Law and Legal History at Yale Law School. The Society is run by a Council, chaired by Professor John Cairns, Professor of Legal History at the University of Edinburgh School of Law. The President of the Society is Lord Stewart.

As part of its aim of furthering study Scots legal history, the Stair Society produces printed and electronic publications, specifically an annual volume along with occasional other publications. The Society's Literary Director is Mark Godfrey, Professor of Legal History at the University of Glasgow School of Law.

The Society also provides a postgraduate scholarship to support someone undertaking doctoral research (i.e. leading to degrees of Ph.D. or D.Phil.) in the area of Scots legal history. The scholarship has had one successful graduate so far but is currently suspended.

Viscount Stair
James Dalrymple, 1st Viscount of Stair, generally known as Viscount Stair, was an important political figure in seventeenth century Scotland and served as Lord President of the Court of Session from 1671 to 1681 and 1689 to 1695. The first edition of his "Institutions of the Law of Scotland", an account of the private law of Scotland according to the judgements of the Court of Session, was published in 1681, and the work is now considered the foundation of modern Scots law.

See also
James Dalrymple, 1st Viscount of Stair
Selden Society

References

External links
Stair Society

1934 establishments in Scotland
Charities based in Scotland
Learned societies of Scotland
Text publication societies
Legal organisations based in Scotland
Legal history of Scotland
Organizations established in 1934
Organisations based in East Lothian